Weenhayek may refer to:
 Weenhayek people
 Weenhayek language

Language and nationality disambiguation pages